The Karara mine is a large iron mine located in the Mid-West region of Western Australia. Karara has an estimated reserves of 2 billion tonnes of ore grading 35.5% iron metal.  It is one of the few magnetite producers in Western Australia.  It is owned by Ansteel Group (52.16%) and Gindalbie Metals (47.84%). The mine is operated by Karara Mining Limited.

Timeline 
 In 2011, steelwork for the Karara project was delayed by major floods in Thailand.
 In 2014, production was increased by over 35% in the June quarter, with more than 2 million tons of iron ore being shipped. Despite the increase the project was still not making a profit.

Transport 
The ore would be initially by a narrow gauge railway to the existing port of Geraldton in quantities up to 10 Mtpa.  When a standard gauge railway is built to a new port at Oakajee, the tonnage will increase to at least 30Mtpa. The common part of the narrow gauge and standard gauge routes will be dual gauge.

The Karara branch junctions of the main line just north of Morawa.

References 

Iron ore mines in Western Australia
Shire of Perenjori
Surface mines in Australia